This article presents the discography of Outlandish, a Danish hip-hop group.

Albums

Studio albums

Compilation albums

Singles

As featured artist

References 

Discographies of Danish artists